KUVM may refer to:

 KUVM-LD, a television station (channel 10, virtual 10) licensed to Houston, Texas, United States
 KUVM-CD, a television station (digital & virtual channel 34) licensed to Missouri City, Texas